The World Is My Home: A Memoir (1992) is an autobiography written by James A. Michener.

Beginning with his time in the South Pacific, the subject of and location where he wrote his first book, Michener ranges through the course of his life by the subjects that affected him.  Michener provides insight into his discovery of the locations he would later write about including Espiritu Santo and Bali Ha'i from Tales of the South Pacific.

References 
Michener, James, The World Is My Home: A Memoir, New York: Random House,1992, Print.

1992 non-fiction books
Books by James A. Michener
Literary autobiographies